Autocross in Australia is type of motorsport sanctioned by the Confederation of Australian Motor Sport (CAMS), which defines it as a speed event staged on a dirt course less than two kilometres long. Racers are timed against the clock, aiming to complete the course in the shortest time.

This form of racing serves as an introduction to rallying. Some events are held at twilight to intensify the challenge.

Competitors

CAMS regulations require a driver in a speed event to be of at least 14 years old. Competitors require a Level 2 Speed (L2S) or Level 2 Speed Junior (L2SJ) license.

The Victorian Club Autocross Series has three driver class: Ladies, Open and Junior (being under 18 at the start of the season).

Both amateur and experienced drivers are free to compete, making Autocross a good introduction to other forms of motorsport.

Vehicles

While CAMS defines vehicle classes as being free to the discretion of the event directors, it specifies that vehicles must comply with the base requirements.

Venues/Courses

CAMS requires that autocross tracks be recognised and licensed for competition.

New South Wales
Deniliquin

South Australia
SEAC Park, Mt Gambier

Victoria
Kyneton

Bagshot motorsport complex

Mt Cottrell (closed June 2013)

Swan Hill

Broadford

Boisdale

Mafeking Rover Park

Avalon Raceway

Shepparton

Officials

Officials for events are volunteers licensed by CAMS. Official Positions include Clerk of Course, Director, Secretary, Chief Steward, Assistant Stewards, Scrutineers, Flag Marshalls, First Aid officers, Timekeepers and Paddock Marshalls.

References

External link
 Autocross Standing Regulations - Motorsport Australia

Motorsport in Australia